John David Mathews from Pennsylvania State University, State College, PA was named Fellow of the Institute of Electrical and Electronics Engineers (IEEE) in 2012 for contributions to radar observations of meteors.

References

Fellow Members of the IEEE
Living people
Year of birth missing (living people)
Place of birth missing (living people)
Pennsylvania State University faculty
American electrical engineers